Westringia rigida (common name stiff westringia) is a shrub in the Lamiaceae family that is endemic to Australia. and

Range
It is found in Western Australia, South Australia, Victoria, New South Wales and Tasmania.

Description 

Westringia rigida is a shrub, growing from  30 to 60 cm high, and has stiff and often tangled branches. The sessile leaves generally occur in whorls of three. The leaf blades are from 1.9 to 5.2 mm long by 1 to 2 mm wide, with entire margins and recurved to revolute, and both upper and lower surfaces are sparsely to densely hairy.

The bracteoles are 1 to 1.5 mm long. The outer surface of the green calyx is densely hairy. The corolla is 6 to 7 mm long, and is white, frequently with a mauve tinge, and orange to orange-brown dots.

Taxonomy 
The species was formally described in 1810 by botanist Robert Brown.

References

rigida
Eudicots of Western Australia
Taxa named by Robert Brown (botanist, born 1773)
Plants described in 1810
Lamiales of Australia